Shin Yi is a South Korean actress and model known for her drama roles in Grand Prince, Joseon Survival Period and When I Was Most Beautiful. She has also appeared in movies such as My Boyfriend Is Type B, Shinsukki Blues and Everybody Has Secrets.

Biography and career
Shin Yi, also known as Jang Seung Hee, is a South Korean actress. She was born on November 6, 1978 in Daegu, South Korea. She attended Daekyeung University to study theater and film and graduated in 1998. She changed her name from Jang Seung-hee to Shin Yi and made her acting debut in 1998. She starred in a supporting role in the movie Everybody Has Secrets. After that she has appeared in numerous films and several television dramas, including Something Happened in Bali for which she was awarded best supporting actress. She has also appeared in Grand Prince, Joseon Survival Period, and When I Was Most Beautiful. She was nominated for best supporting actress in her role in the movie My Boyfriend Is Type B.

Personal life
Shin Yi is married and has four children: one son and three daughters.

Filmography

Television series

Film

Variety show

Awards and nominations
 2004 SBS Drama Awards: Awarded For Female Supporting Actress in Something Happened in Bali
 2005 Grand Bell Awards: Nominated For Best Supporting Actress in My Boyfriend Is Type B

References

External links
 
 

1978 births
Living people
21st-century South Korean actresses
South Korean female models
South Korean television actresses
South Korean film actresses
People from Daegu